Karen Harding (born 18 November 1991) is an English singer and songwriter from Consett, County Durham. Her first single, "Say Something", released in February 2015, entered the top 10 of the UK Singles Chart.

Early life
Born to an English father and Filipino mother, Harding grew up in Consett and attended Moorside Community Technology College. She used to work at her parents' oriental food store and, in 2008, won a regional music competition called Music Means Life. One of her first recordings was a cover version of the anti-racism song "Strange Fruit", made famous by Billie Holiday.

She is a supporter of Newcastle United.

Music career
In 2010, she competed on the television programme Eurovision: Your Country Needs You, the national final deciding who would represent the United Kingdom in that year's Eurovision Song Contest. She was eliminated in the penultimate round after singing Kylie Minogue's "What Do I Have to Do". Harding was a contestant on the tenth series of the television singing competition The X Factor, but was eliminated at the boot camp stage during the controversial six-chair challenge.

Following The X Factor, Harding was approached by the producer MNEK, who had seen a video she uploaded onto the Internet of her covering Disclosure's "Latch". She was subsequently signed by Disclosure's record label, Method Records. Her first single, the MNEK-produced "Say Something", was released in January 2015 by Method and Capitol Records and attracted notice from Fact magazine, MuuMuse, Noisey and The Singles Jukebox. "Say Something" entered the UK Singles Chart and peaked at number seven, with frequent airplay on BBC Radio 1 and its sister station, 1Xtra. It spent 26 weeks on the official charts and achieved platinum status.

Harding has worked with producers and songwriters such as Tom Aspaul, CocknBullKid, Mark J. Feist, Rodney Jerkins, Jimmy Napes and Richard Stannard. She is featured on the house duo Arches' single "New Love", released in April 2015, and on Blonde's single "Feel Good (It's Alright)", released in August 2015. Harding played at several festivals during mid-2015, including Birmingham Pride, Ibiza Rocks, Lovebox, Manchester Pride and Parklife.

Harding's influences include female solo artists such as Mariah Carey, Whitney Houston, Janet Jackson and Lisa Stansfield, as well as dance and garage acts Artful Dodger, Craig David and Madison Avenue. She has also cited house music of the 1990s as an influence.

In May 2016, Harding was selected to perform the English national anthem at the 2016 FA Cup Final. However, she missed her cue, and only managed to join in with the crowd for the last few lines.

Discography

Extended plays

Singles

As lead artist

As featured artist

Guest appearances

Songwriting credits

References

1991 births
Living people
Capitol Records artists
English dance musicians
English house musicians
English people of Filipino descent
British contemporary R&B singers
Musicians from County Durham
People from Consett
The X Factor (British TV series) contestants
Filipino British musicians
21st-century English women singers
21st-century English singers